Giovanni Sartori (13 May 1924 – 4 April 2017) was an Italian political scientist who specialized in the study of democracy, political parties and comparative politics.

Biography
Born in Florence in 1924, Sartori graduated in Political and Social Sciences at the University of Florence in 1946. He stayed on at the University of Florence, teaching History of Modern Philosophy and Doctrine of the State starting in 1946. He became a lecturer in Modern Philosophy (1950–56) and in Political Science (1956–63), and subsequently professor of Sociology (1963–66). Sartori became full professor of Political Science and taught at Florence University from 1966 to 1976.

During this time, Sartori founded the first modern Political Science academic post in Italy, and was Dean of the newly formed University of Florence's Department of Political Science.

Sartori also taught at the European University Institute (1974–76) and then became professor of Political Science at Stanford University (1976–79). Finally, Sartori served as Albert Schweitzer Professor in the Humanities at Columbia University from 1979 to 1994 and was appointed professor emeritus.

Sartori was President of the Committee for Conceptual and Terminological Analysis (COCTA) of IPSA, the International Sociological Association (ISA), and the International Social Science Council (ISSC) from 1970 to 1979. 

He was founder and editor of the Rivista Italiana di Scienza Politica (Italian Political Science Review) from 1971 to 2003.

Sartori was also a regular contributor, as an op-ed writer, of the leading Italian newspaper Corriere della Sera.

Sartori died at the age of 92 in Rome from throat cancer on 4 April 2017.

Honors and awards
Giovanni Sartori received multiple honors and awards throughout his career.

 1971 President of the Italian Republic’s Gold Medal for Cultural and Educational Merits.
 1975 Fellow of American Academy of Arts and Sciences
 1998 Outstanding Book Award of the American Political Science Association (APSA) for Parties and Party Systems: A Framework for Analysis (1976).
 1999 Commander of the Order of the Southern Cross, Brazil.
 2005 Princess of Asturias Awards for Social Sciences
 2005 Lifetime Achievement Award, European Consortium for Political Research (ECPR).
 2006 Lifetime Achievement Award, Qualitative Method Section of APSA, for Exceptional Contributions to Social Science Methodology.
 2006  Life Achievement Award, American Political Science Association.
 2007 The Mattei Dogan Foundation Prize in European Political Sociology, ECPR, University of Essex, England, Pisa. 
 2009 Karl Deutsch Award of the International Political Science Association (IPSA), which honours a prominent scholar engaged in the cross-disciplinary research. 
 2013 Premio Isaiah Berlin. 
 2014  Grand Cross of the Order of Bernardo O'Higgins, Chile

In 2015, he received a Mexican venera of the Order of the Aztec Eagle from president Enrique Peña Nieto.

He has received doctor Honoris Causa from the University of Genoa, 1992; Georgetown University, Washington D.C.,1994; University of Guadalajara, 1997; University of Buenos Aires, 1998; Complutense University of Madrid, 2001; University of Bucharest, 2001; University of Athens.

Since 2004, the American Political Science Association (APSA) Organized Section for Qualitative and Multi-Method Research gives the Giovanni Sartori Book Award annually to "honors Giovanni Sartori's work on qualitative methods and concept formation, and especially his contribution to helping scholars think about problems of context as they refine concepts and apply them to new spatial and temporal settings."

Research
Sartori's interests were wide-ranging, but his lasting contributions were largely on political parties, constitutional design, and perhaps most significantly, concept analysis.

On concepts
Sartori was deeply interested in the formation, analysis, and use of political concepts.  He observed that political science, for better or worse, lacked the coordination in terminology that he presumed to exist in the physical and biological sciences.  He encouraged a more "intentional" use of concepts, with the objective of furthering a shared understanding of ideas.  In 1970, he and others established the first permanent research committee of the newly created International Political Science Association (IPSA).  The committee, Research Committee on Concepts and Methods (RC 01), was intended to ameliorate the "Tower of Babel problem" in political science, and is still active.

Sartori's 1970 article "Concept Misformation in Comparative Politics" published in The American Political Science Review is prominent in the field, leading Gary Goertz to write, "There are few articles in political science that deserve the predicate "classic," but Sartori's ... merits the label." Sartori's notions of "conceptual traveling" (the application of a concept from one case to a new case) and "conceptual stretching" (the mismatch that happens when a concept does not fit a new case) is influential in social science methodology. Conceptual stretching is frequently used as a criticism of studies that employ large-N quantitative analysis.

On parties and party systems
Sartori's Parties and Party Systems: A Framework for Analysis (1976) is a book that is seen as having as "outstanding, lasting significance to the field" on study on political parties. The book provides a comprehensive and authoritative approach to the classification of party systems.

Selected publications 
 Sartori, Giovanni. 1957. Democrazia e Definizioni. Bologna: Il Mulino.
 Sartori, Giovanni. 1962. Democratic Theory. Detroit, Wayne University Press.
 Sartori, Giovanni. 1966. "European Political Parties: The Case of Polarized Pluralism," pp. 137– 176, in J. LaPalombara and M. Weiner (eds.), Political Parties and Political Development. Princeton, N.J., Princeton University Press.
 Sartori, Giovanni. 1969. "From the Sociology of Politics to Political Sociology," pp. 65–100, in S.M. Lipset (ed.), Politics and the Social Sciences. New York, Oxford University Press. 
 Sartori, Giovanni. 1970. "Concept Misformation in Comparative Politics." The American Political Science Review 64 (4): 1033–1053.
 Sartori, Giovanni, Fred W. Riggs, and Henry Teune. 1975. Tower of Babel: On the Definition and Analysis of Concepts in the Social Sciences. Pittsburgh: International Studies Association. 
 Sartori, Giovanni. 1976. Parties and Party Systems: A Framework for Analysis. New York: Cambridge University Press.
 Sartori, Giovanni (ed.). 1984. Social Science Concepts: A Systematic Analysis. London, Sage.
 Sartori, Giovanni. 1984. "Guidelines for Concept Analysis,"  pp. 15–85, in Giovanni Sartori (ed.), Social Science Concepts: A Systematic Analysis. London, Sage.
 Sartori, Giovanni. 1987. The Theory of Democracy Revisited, vol. 1, The Contemporary Debate; vol. 2, The Classical Issues. Chatham, N.J: Chatham House.
 Sartori, Giovanni. 1991. "Comparing and Miscomparing." Journal of Theoretical Politics (3)3: 243–257. 
 Sartori, Giovanni. 1994. Comparative Constitutional Engineering. New York: New York University Press.
 Sartori, Giovanni. 1994. "Neither Presidentialism nor Parliamentarism," pp. 106–118, in J.J. Linz e A. Valenzuela (eds.), The Failure of Presidential Democracy. Baltimore: Johns Hopkins University Press.
 Sartori, Giovanni. 1997. Homo Videns: televisione e post-pensiero. Rome-Bari: Laterza.
 Sartori, Giovanni. 2000. Pluralismo, multiculturalismo e estranei: saggio sulla società multietnica. Milan: Rizzoli.
 Sartori, Giovanni. 2004. Mala tempora. Rome-Bari: Laterza.
 Sartori, Giovanni. 2006. Mala costituzione e altri malanni. Rome-Bari: Laterza.
 Sartori, Giovanni. 2009. Concepts and Method in Social Science. The Tradition of Giovanni Sartori. Edited by David Collier and John Gerring, New York and London: Routledge.

Resources on Sartori and his research 
 Collier David, and John Gerring. 2009. "Giovanni Sartori & His Legacy," in David Collier and John Gerring (eds.), Giovanni Sartori, Concepts and Method in Social Science. The Tradition of Giovanni Sartori. New York and London: Routledge.
 Cotta, Maurizio. 2017. "Sartori: a towering figure of international political science, the founder of contemporary Italian political science and a mordant political polemicist." European Political Science 16(3): 430–435.
 Kubát, Michal, and Martin Mejstřík. (eds.). 2019. Giovanni Sartori. Challenging Political Science. Rowman & Littlefield Publishers.
 Pasquino, Gianfranco (ed.). 2005. La Scienza Politica di Giovanni Sartori. Bologna: Il Mulino. The chapters of this book are celebration notes by Italian scholars (Domenico Fisichella, Angelo Panebianco) that have had some kind of collaboration with Sartori.
 Pasquino, Gianfranco. 2005. "The Political Science of Giovanni Sartori." European Political Science 4(1): 33–41.
 Pasquino, Gianfranco. 2020. Bobbio y Sartori. Comprender y cambiar la política." Buenos Aires: Eudeba.
 Rubí Calderón, José Ramón López (ed.). 2009. Para Leer a Sartori. Mexico,. This book is in Spanish, featuring articles by Gianfranco Pasquino and Dieter Nohlen, and is wide in scope. Besides, it seems, is more critical and more student-oriented. It covers the very Political Science part of Sartori's bulk of work, as well as the books that he has published dealing with such themes as multiculturalism, "videopolitics" and the environment.
 Sartori, Giovanni. 1999. "Chance, Luck and Stubborness," pp. 93-100, in Hans Daalder (ed.), Comparative European Politics. The Story of a Profession''. New York: Casell/Pinter.
 Sartori, Giovanni. 2018. "Note biografiche e bibliografia."

See also 
 Polarized pluralism
 Qualitative research
 Robert A. Dahl
 Maurice Duverger

References

External links
 Sartori's biography on ItaliaLibri
 Review of Pluralism, Multiculturalism and Foreigners: an Essay on Multiethnic Society 
 Columbia University Giovanni Sartori videos
 Gianfranco Pasquino. (2005). "The Political Science of Giovanni Sartori". European Political Science 4 (1), 33–41.

1924 births
2017 deaths
Deaths from cancer in Lazio
Deaths from throat cancer
Columbia University faculty
Academic staff of the European University Institute
Italian male journalists
Italian magazine editors
Italian political scientists
Academic staff of the University of Florence